Coppia ferrarese , also known as ciopa, ciupeta and pane ferrarese, is a type of sourdough bread made with flour, lard, malt, and olive oil, and has a twisted shape. It was first made around the thirteenth century in Ferrara, Italy. It has PGI status under European Law, which was obtained in 2001.

History
The first record of special regulations regarding bread making in Ferrara date from a statute in 1287. The first mention of a bread similar to current coppia ferrarese dates from 1536 when, according to Cristoforo da Messisbugo, the Duke of Este was offered a pane ritorto (woven bread) during the Carnival. The tradition of cooking this sort of bread remained throughout history until the unification of Italy. In 2001, the recipe gained PGI status under European Law.

Recipe
Ingredients:
 of "0" type soft wheat flour,  of water,  of pure pork lard,  of extra virgin olive oil,  of "mother" natural yeast, salt and malt.

Cooking:
Mix the ingredients for between fifteen and twenty minutes to make a dough. The dough is stretched into a cylinder which is then cut into strips and wound. The resulting bread is placed on a wooden board, covered with a sheet and placed in a leavening room for between seventy and ninety minutes. The bread is cooked in fixed bowl ovens.

To meet the regulations, the bread must meet certain conditions, such as a maximum humidity of between 12 and 15% and be sold within twenty four hours.

Cultural impact
Coppia ferrarese is a staple of the culture of the city of Ferrara, and has been named as one of the two most critical part of the cuisine (alongside a specialist salami). In 2008, Folco Quilici recounts how his family would quickly bring any conversation with strangers around to the bread. It is named the best bread in the world by Riccardo Bacchelli in Il mulino del Po while Corrado Govoni talks of "Il nostro Pane: orgoglio di noi ferraresi. Dono dell'aria, dell'acqua, dell'uomo. Offerta generosa di Ferrara al mondo” ("Our Bread: pride of us from Ferrara. Gift of air, water, of man. Generous gift of Ferrara to the world").

References

Cuisine of Emilia-Romagna
Italian breads
Sourdough breads
Italian products with protected designation of origin
Province of Ferrara